Spudshed is an independent supermarket chain that is a part of the Galati Group based in Western Australia. Spudshed was founded by Tony Galati, with all stores owned by the Galati family business. 

The chain consists of a total of 17 stores across Western Australia as of August 2022. Its main competitors are Woolworths, Coles, Aldi and IGA. Most stores operate 24 hours a day, and are among the only supermarkets in the state able to do so.

History
The first Spudshed was opened in Baldivis in November 1998, originally as a farmers market in a shed on Galati's Baldivis property. In 2018, Spudshed reported profit growth of 76%, or $4 million.

Tony Galati 
Spudshed founder Antonino "Tony" Galati was born on 1 April 1961 and is the eldest son of Sicilian migrants Francessco and Maria Galati, who started a two-hectare market garden in Spearwood in the 1960s. He has a brother, Vincenzo "Vince" Galati and a sister. Galati has 3 sons and a daughter, Francessco Galati, Sebastian Galati, Anthony Galati and Alana Galati.

He became a household name in Western Australia for his protracted legal battles against the Potato Marketing Corporation of Western Australia. In 2015, the PMC launched legal action against Galati, alleging that he had planted more than his allocated quota of potatoes. Prohibited from selling excess potatoes due to legal quotas, Galati used free potato giveaways at his Spudshed stores to protest against what he considered to be unfair and excessive control by the board. Galati ultimately prevailed when the state government deregulated the industry, with the PMC becoming defunct in December 2016.

The battle between Galati and the PMC was celebrated in a Fringe World musical in 2019, returning again in 2020.

Notes

See also

List of supermarket chains in Oceania

References

External links

Supermarkets of Australia
Agriculture in Western Australia
Companies based in Perth, Western Australia
Greengrocers
City of Stirling
Australian companies established in 1998
Retail companies established in 1998